James Berger Orlin (born April 19, 1953) is an American operations researcher, the Edward Pennell Brooks Professor in Management and Professor of Operations Research at the MIT Sloan School of Management.

Biography
Orlin did his undergraduate studies at the University of Pennsylvania, receiving a bachelor's degree in mathematics in 1974. In 1976, he earned two master's degrees, an MSc from California Institute of Technology and an MMath from University of Waterloo. Orlin received his Ph.D. in operations research from Stanford University in 1981 under the supervision of Arthur Fales Veinott Jr. He joined the MIT faculty as an assistant professor in 1979, and became the Brooks Professor in 1998.

Selected works
He is the author of the book Network Flows: Theory, Algorithms, and Applications (with Thomas L. Magnanti and Ravindra K. Ahuja, Prentice Hall, 1993), for which he and his co-authors were the recipients of the 1993 Frederick W. Lanchester Prize of the Institute for Operations Research and the Management Sciences.

Honors and awards
He is also a Fellow of INFORMS and a Margaret MacVicar Faculty Fellow, MIT's highest teaching honor.

References

External links
Jim Orlin's blog

1953 births
Living people
American operations researchers
University of Pennsylvania alumni
California Institute of Technology alumni
Stanford University alumni
MIT Sloan School of Management faculty
Fellows of the Institute for Operations Research and the Management Sciences